Hensel's snake (Ditaxodon taeniatus) is a snake endemic to southern Brazil It is monotypic in the genus Ditaxodon.

References 

Dipsadinae
Monotypic snake genera
Snakes of South America
Reptiles of Brazil
Endemic fauna of Brazil
Reptiles described in 1868
Taxa named by Wilhelm Peters